William Rankin Patton (born June 14, 1954) is an American actor and audiobook narrator. He starred as Colonel Dan Weaver in the TNT science fiction series Falling Skies. He also appeared in the films Remember the Titans, Armageddon, Gone in 60 Seconds, The Punisher, and Minari. He appeared opposite Kevin Costner in two films: No Way Out (1987) and The Postman (1997), as well as having a guest role in seasons 3 and 4 of Costner's Paramount Network series Yellowstone. He won two Obie Awards for best actor in Sam Shepard's play Fool for Love and the Public Theater production of What Did He See?

Early life

Patton was born in Charleston, South Carolina, the eldest of three children. His father is Bill Patton, a playwright and acting/directing instructor who was a Lutheran minister and served as a chaplain at Duke University. Patton was raised on a farm, where his parents ran a foster home for wayward teenagers.

Career

Patton won two Obie Awards for best actor for his performances in Sam Shepard's play Fool for Love and the Public Theater production of What Did He See? He portrayed the evil antagonist in Desperately Seeking Susan, and had a significant role in No Way Out, his first major film. He was nominated for the Saturn Award for Best Supporting Actor for his portrayal of General Bethlehem in The Postman. He portrayed coach Bill Yoast in Remember the Titans, and FBI agent Melvin Purvis in the 1991 made-for-television film Dillinger, before an acclaimed supporting actor performance in Armageddon. Patton provided the voice for the audio version of The Assault on Reason by Al Gore, as well as the role of Alan Wilson on the TV show 24. He recorded the audio version for 22 books written by best-selling mystery writer James Lee Burke.  Patton plays the character of Sam Conroy in the film American Violet.

From 2011 to 2015, he starred as Colonel Weaver in the TNT sci-fi television series Falling Skies, executive-produced by Steven Spielberg.

In 2018, Patton portrayed Officer Frank Hawkins in the horror reboot of Halloween, and reprised his role in its two sequels Halloween Kills (2021) and Halloween Ends (2022).

In 2019, Patton portrayed Avery Sunderland in the DC Universe TV series, Swamp Thing.

Filmography

Film

Television

Voice work

Audio books

References

External links

1954 births

American male film actors

American male television actors

Audiobook narrators

Living people

Obie Award recipients

Male actors from Charleston, South Carolina